Neil F. Libbey is an author and historian  in Sydney, Nova Scotia, a community in the Cape Breton Regional Municipality.

Personal

Born in Hollywood, California and raised in San Dimas he moved to Cape Breton in 1985.

Libbey is a graduate of the University College of Cape Breton and the University of Maine and is a teacher by trade.

Professional

Libbey authored Portside: An Early History of the Royal Cape Breton Yacht Club in 2003 and contributed articles to The Encyclopedia of Yacht Designers published in 2005.

Books

References

American expatriates in Canada
Canadian educators
21st-century Canadian historians
Canadian male non-fiction writers
Writers from Nova Scotia
People from Los Angeles County, California
People from the Cape Breton Regional Municipality
Living people
Cape Breton University alumni
People from San Dimas, California
Year of birth missing (living people)